Touring Kirol Elkartea is a Spanish football team based in Errenteria, in the autonomous community of Basque Country. Founded in 1923, it plays in División de Honor, holding home matches at Campo de Fútbol de Fandería.

The club was founded under the name of Club Deportivo Touring, changing to its current name in 2012.

Season to season

1 season in Segunda División B
25 seasons in Tercera División

External links
 
ArefePedia team profile 

Football clubs in the Basque Country (autonomous community)
Association football clubs established in 1923
1923 establishments in Spain